Lambart is a surname. Notable people with the surname include:

Charles Lambart, 1st Earl of Cavan PC (Ire) (1600–1660), MP for the rotten borough of Bossiney and a military commander
Charles Lambart, 3rd Earl of Cavan (1649–1702), inherited the Earldom of Cavan in 1690 from Richard Lambart, 2nd Earl of Cavan
Evelyn Lambart (1914–1999), Canadian animator and technical director with the National Film Board of Canada
Ford Lambart, 5th Earl of Cavan (1718–1772), Irish peer and freemason
Rudolph Lambart, 10th Earl of Cavan, KP, GCB, GCMG, GCVO, GBE (1865–1946), British Army commander during WWI
Frederick Lambart, 8th Earl of Cavan (born 1815), hereditary peer
Frederick Lambart, 9th Earl of Cavan KP, PC (1839–1900), Irish peer who served in the Royal Navy and as a Liberal politician
Horace Lambart, 11th Earl of Cavan (1878–1950), soldier and priest
Michael Lambart, 12th Earl of Cavan (1911–1988), hereditary peer
Oliver Lambart, 1st Baron Lambart (died 1618), military commander and an MP in the Irish House of Commons
Richard Lambart, 2nd Earl of Cavan (1628–1691), Member of Parliament for Kilbeggan between 1647 and 1649
Richard Lambart, 4th Earl of Cavan PC (I) (died 1742), inherited the Earldom of Cavan in 1702 from Charles Lambart, 3rd Earl of Cavan
Richard Lambart, 6th Earl of Cavan (died 1778), Anglo-Irish peer and soldier
Richard Lambart, 7th Earl of Cavan (1763–1837), military commander throughout the Napoleonic era and beyond
Roger Lambart, 13th Earl of Cavan (born 1944), hereditary peer